Trúc Hồ (born April 2, 1964) is a  Vietnamese American musician turned producer, known for his contributions to the musical variety shows Asia (produced by his company Asia Entertainment), as well as his 24-hour Vietnamese channel Saigon Broadcasting Television Network.

Works

Notable songs 
 Bước Chân Việt Nam - Footprints of Viet Nam
 Con Đường Việt Nam
 Một Ngày Việt Nam
 Việt Nam Niềm Nhớ
 Chúng Tôi Muốn Sống
 Triệu Con Tim
 Cơn Mưa Hạ
 Trái Tim Mùa Đông
 Mưa Tình Cuối Đông
 Một Lần Nữa Thôi
 Dòng Sông Kỷ Niệm
 Em Đã Quên Một Giòng Sông
 Lời Dối Gian Chân Thành
 Làm Thơ Tình Em Đọc
 Làm Lại Từ Đầu
 Yêu Em Âm Thầm
 Tình Đầu Vẫn Khó Phai
 Cát Biển Chiều Nay
 Đỉnh Gió Hú
 Tình Yêu
 Sẽ Hơn Bao Giờ Hết
 Mãi Yêu Người Thôi
 Nếu Không Có Em
 Một Nửa Đời Em
 Giữa Hai Mùa Mưa Nắng
 Như Vạt Nắng
 Trong Cuộc Tình Ân Hận
 Chỉ Là Phù Du Thôi
 Thôi Thế Thì Chia Tay
 Dù Chỉ Một Lần Thôi

Filmography 

 Journey from the Fall as Executive Producer
 Con Mua Ha as a Director

Activism 

For several years Truc Ho has been an activist for "human rights and democracy in Vietnam".  His liberal-conservative campaign named "One Million Hearts, One Voice" collected over 135,000 signatures from 63 nations on a petition to be presented to the U.N. Human Rights Council.

See also 

 Saigon Broadcasting Television Network - SBTN

References

External links 
 Asia Entertainment
 Saigon Broadcasting Television Network
 Many of Truc Ho's Songs

1964 births
Living people
People from Ho Chi Minh City
American musicians of Vietnamese descent
American record producers
American music industry executives
Vietnamese emigrants to the United States
20th-century Vietnamese male singers
Vietnamese songwriters
Neoconservatism